, also called chiburi, is the process by which one symbolically removes blood from a sword blade. The term chiburui can thus be translated as "shaking off the blood". In the Japanese martial art of iaidō, this is done before nōtō or placing the blade back into the scabbard (known as saya).

In popular culture
In films set in feudal Japan, such as Zatoichi, chiburi is usually performed by swordsmen after the killing of an opponent. However, chiburi is incorrectly portrayed as a simple swipe that completely removes all of the blood. In reality, the sword needs to be thoroughly wiped with a cloth as there would still be enough blood on the blade to cause rusting.

Notes

References

Japanese swordsmanship
Japanese martial arts terminology